VfL Lübeck-Schwartau is a men's handball club from Bad Schwartau, Germany, that plays in the 2. Handball-Bundesliga.

Accomplishments
 DHB-Pokal:
 : 2001

Team

Current squad 
Squad for the 2020–21 season

Goalkeepers 
 32  Dennis Klockmann
 49  Nils Conrad

Left Wingers
2  Thees Glabisch
7  Fynn Gonschor
Right Wingers
 23  Janik Schrader
 24  Finn Kretschmer
Line players 
 13  Carl Löfström
 15  Fynn Ranke

Left Backs
9  Mex Raguse
 18  Martin Waschul
 19  Jan Schult
Central Backs
 10  Julius Lindskog Andersson
 11  Markus Hansen
Right Backs 
 20  Niels Versteijnen
 77  Jasper Bruhn

Transfers 
Transfers for the 2020–21 season

Joining
  Nils Conrad (GK) (from  TUSEM Essen)
  Felix Kasch (LB) (from  TM Tønder Håndbold)
  Julius Lindskog Andersson (CB) (from  TuS Ferndorf)
  Carl Löfström (P) (from  TSV Bayer Dormagen)

Leaving
  Marino Mallwitz (GK) (to  DJK Rimpar Wölfe)
  Paweł Genda (LB) (to ?)
  Przemysław Mrozowicz (LB) (end of loan  Zagłębie Lubin)
  Tim Claasen (CB) (to  HSG Ostsee N/G)
  Sigtryggur Daði Rúnarsson (CB) (to  ÍBV)
  Nikola Potić (RB) (to  RK Metalurg Skopje)
  Marcel Möller (P) (to  DHK Flensborg)

References

German handball clubs
Handball-Bundesliga
Handball clubs established in 2002
2002 establishments in Germany
Sport in Schleswig-Holstein